Ruslan Teverov (born 1 May 1994) is a Belarusian footballer playing currently for Vitebsk.

References

External links
 
 
 Profile at teams.by

1994 births
Living people
Sportspeople from Vitebsk
Belarusian footballers
Association football midfielders
Belarusian expatriate footballers
Expatriate footballers in Kazakhstan
FC Naftan Novopolotsk players
FC Gorodeya players
FC Vitebsk players
FC Shakhtyor Soligorsk players
FC Zhetysu players